Phyllocnistis vitella is a moth of the family Gracillariidae, known from Russia. The hostplant for the species is Vitis amurensis.

References

Phyllocnistis
Endemic fauna of Russia